Farid Haghighi (also Romanized as "Fa'rīd Haghighī"; born December 2, 1989 in Tehran) is an Iranian karateka. He also won the silver medal in  World Karate Championships in 2007 and Bronze medal 2012 and Silver medal 2013 Karate1 Premier League. 
He began Karate training at age 8 with his first coach Bahram Azizi And since 2003 under the supervision of Amir Yari
he has continued the sport. He is the first men's medalist at the Kata World Championships in Iran.

References

External links 
 Turkish karate federation
 Les-sports
 Instagram page of Farid Haghighi
 karate world youtube
 karate record
 wkf ranking 
  Match movie/didei.ir

1989 births
Sportspeople from Tehran
Living people
Iranian male karateka
20th-century Iranian people
21st-century Iranian people